Barnsdall Art Park is a city park located in the East Hollywood district of Los Angeles, California. Parking and arts buildings access is from Hollywood Boulevard on the north side of the park. The park is a Los Angeles Historic-Cultural Monument, and a facility of the City of Los Angeles Department of Cultural Affairs.

Aline Barnsdall donated Barnsdall Park to the City of Los Angeles for arts and recreational purposes, including the preservation of the historic architecture and landscape features. Located at the crest of Olive Hill, Barnsdall Art Park overlooks the city of Los Angeles, and the Hollywood Hills, including Griffith Park. The park is centered on Barnsdall's Hollyhock House designed by architect Frank Lloyd Wright, a National Historic Landmark, Los Angeles Historic-Cultural Monument, World Heritage Site, and on the National Register of Historic Places in Los Angeles.

History
Aline Barnsdall, a native of Bradford, Pennsylvania and heiress to an oil fortune, was led by her interest in the future of the American stage to Chicago, Illinois, where she co-directed an experimental theatre company. While in Chicago, she met the equally unconventional Frank Lloyd Wright, whose recently completed Midway Gardens she admired.

A trip to California turned Barnsdall's attention to Los Angeles. In 1915 she commissioned Wright to help her develop an innovative theatrical community on the nation's western cultural frontier. Selecting a thirty-six acre site in East Hollywood known as Olive Hill, Barnsdall and Wright worked together to develop a plan that included a home for Barnsdall and her young daughter, two secondary residences, a theater, a director's house, a dormitory for actors, studios for artists, shops, and a motion picture theater. The site plan was based on the gridded spacing of the existing olive grove’s 1225 trees.

In subsequent decades, the park has become popular among residents from the nearby districts. The park has a wide variety of park visitors, as it sits at the intersection of a number of Los Angeles demographic groups.

Hollyhock House

The Aline Barnsdall Residence, known as Hollyhock House, was the first Los Angeles project of Frank Lloyd Wright. Built between 1919 and 1921, it represents his earliest efforts to develop a regionally appropriate style of architecture for Southern California.

Taking advantage of the area's mild climate, Hollyhock House is a combination of house and gardens. It is a remarkable example of Wright's love of nature and the way he incorporated it into his designs. The house takes its name from the hollyhock blossom, the favorite flower of Aline Barnsdall. Wright's abstracted hollyhock patterns were incorporated into the decoration motif on and in the residence.

Wright was often absent during the actual construction of Hollyhock House, due to the demands of a major commission, the Imperial Hotel in Tokyo, Japan. Therefore, he gave supervision of the Barnsdall project to two young Taliesin studio associates: his son Lloyd Wright, and Rudolph Schindler. They both became independently renowned architects.

Art Park

Because of financial and artistic differences, only the two secondary residences and the Barnsdall home, Hollyhock House, were finally built. In 1926, Aline Barnsdall gave Hollyhock House and eleven surrounding acres to the City of Los Angeles for use as a public park in memory of her father, Theodore Barnsdall. The City agreed to take the Hollywood estate, but initially did not do anything with it, likely because of Barnsdall's restrictions on how the land could be used, as well as her controversial ideals. Part of the ensuing negotiations between the City and Barnsdall included a provision that the California Art Club would be granted a fifteen-year lease (1927–1942) on Hollyhock House to use as their clubhouse.

In the 1950s and 1960s additional art center buildings, including a modern theatre, an art gallery, and studios, were built on Olive Hill in the park. In the 1990s the Olive Hill restoration master plan and work was completed, including restoring the original olive groves.

Los Angeles Municipal Art Gallery

The Los Angeles Municipal Art Gallery is a  venue that offers exhibition space for large, thematic group exhibitions and retrospective exhibitions of individual work.

The Junior Arts Center Gallery is a  venue in the building that offers a smaller gallery space. At times the two galleries are used together for single large-scale exhibitions.

Exhibitions program 
The Municipal Art Gallery's exhibitions program produces approximately nine exhibitions of contemporary art per year. The curatorial focus includes painting, sculpture, photography, architecture, design, video, electronic, performance, and installation works. Exhibits at Barnsdall Park receive over 45,000 visitors annually.

Barnsdall Gallery Theatre
The Barnsdall Gallery Theatre (BGT) is owned and operated by Performing Arts in the City of Los Angeles's Department of Cultural Affairs. It is a 299-seat proscenium space rented at  nominal fees to individuals and organizations for live theatre, dance, music, spoken word, lectures, films, and other events.

BGT also presents a variety of community events in the space, including free programs, such as the Independent Shakespeare Company, Music Summer Camps by the Silverlake Conservatory of Music, and many annual festivals, including the Thai Festival and Artwallah.

Independent Shakespeare Company
The Independent Shakespeare Company (ISC) is an ongoing, free live summer series held on an outdoor stage in the park.

In 2004, in association with the City's Department of Cultural Affairs, the ISC established a residency in Barnsdall Art Park. The first production was "The Two Gentlemen of Verona". In October 2004, the ISC toured Richard III in France as part of the 100th anniversary of the Entente Cordiale. This production returned to Los Angeles as part of Free Shakespeare in Barnsdall Art Park 2005, performed in rotation with The Two Gentlemen of Verona and Hamlet.  In 2005, the ISC returned to Barnsdall Art Park with a new production of Hamlet, running in repertory with Richard III and encore performances of The Two Gentlemen of Verona. In 2006, the ISC produced As You Like It and Hamlet.

Silverlake Conservatory of Music
The Silverlake Conservatory of Music presents Music Summer Camps, bringing music to young people at the Barnsdall Gallery Theatre. A team of professional master musicians present a music program combining academic information with live performance. The musicians perform their music and then explain how their instruments fit into the rhythm, chord structure, mood, or melody of a piece. Young people who are interested in a musical career are able to learn from professionals.

Barnsdall Art Center 

The Barnsdall Art Center provides college-level art instruction at low cost in a Frank Lloyd Wright building. The center is temporarily housed in the Junior Arts Center due to the closure of the Frank Lloyd Wright building for safety reasons. The Barnsdall Art Center Student Advisory Committee provides support and student influence for the center's growth. The non-profit organization provides volunteer services with registration and financial assistance by covering programs and classes that the City is unable to fund.

The Junior Arts Center
The Junior Arts Center offers art programs to children and youth aged 3–18. Art instruction held at the center throughout the year includes drawing, painting, film making, printmaking, acting, photography, and sculpture. Parent/child classes are also available. The arts center's children's gallery features the work of young artists.

The Junior Arts Center Gallery provides family-oriented exhibitions by both children's and adults' work, as well as interactive family exhibits. Annual special events include Día de los Muertos, Aline Barnsdall Day, the culmination of children's classes, and the Barnsdall Art Center's students exhibit.

See also
 List of Los Angeles Historic-Cultural Monuments in Hollywood
 List of parks in Los Angeles
 Little Armenia, Los Angeles — community on west.
 Lloyd G. Davies — L.A. City Council member (1943–1951) who urged purchase of adjacent land to prevent development.

References

External links 

 Official Los Angeles Municipal Art Gallery website

 

Arts centers in California
Art museums and galleries in Los Angeles
Parks in Los Angeles
East Hollywood, Los Angeles
Frank Lloyd Wright buildings
Art schools in California
Theatres in Los Angeles
Los Angeles Historic-Cultural Monuments
Event venues established in 1927
1927 establishments in California
Art galleries established in 1927
Hollywood Boulevard
Sculpture gardens, trails and parks in California